Chandrakant Jha (born 1967) is a serial killer who befriended, then killed and dismembered 18 victims in west Delhi between 1998 and 2007. His first killing took place in 1998 for which he was arrested and held in jail until 2002, when he was released due to lack of evidence. Following his release, he embarked upon a spate of killings. First Shekar and Umesh in 2003, then Guddu in 2005, then Amit in 2006 and finally Upender and Dalip in 2007. He would befriend migrant labourers from Bihar and Uttar Pradesh and help them get small jobs. Later, petty disputes over things like theft, lying or being non-vegetarian would lead him to murder them by strangulation. Chandrakant took pleasure in taunting the police by leaving dismembered body parts around the city and outside the Tihar Jail with notes, daring the police to catch him.

He was found guilty on three counts of murder and received two death sentences and life imprisonment until death in February 2013. His death sentences were commuted to life imprisonment without remission in January 2016. In January 2022, his request for parole was denied.

Chandrakant worked as a hawker in Delhi weekly bazaars. He married twice, abandoning his first wife within a year. He has five daughters with his second wife. He mostly lived away from his family.

In popular culture

20 July 2022, Netflix released a Documentary series called
Indian Predator: The Butcher of Delhi, a series on Chandrakant Jha's life and his killings.

References 

1967 births
Indian people convicted of murder
Indian serial killers
Living people
Male serial killers
Prisoners sentenced to death by India
Indian prisoners sentenced to death
Indian prisoners sentenced to life imprisonment
Prisoners sentenced to life imprisonment by India
People from Madhepura district
Criminals from Bihar